
NVC community M2 (Sphagnum cuspidatum/recurvum bog pool community) is one of the mire communities in the British National Vegetation Classification system.

It is a fairly widely distributed community in northern western Britain, and is also found in Norfolk. There are two  subcommunities.

Community composition

The following constant species are found in this community:
 Cross-leaved heath (Erica tetralix)
 Common cottongrass (Eriophorum angustifolium)
 Round-leaved sundew (Drosera rotundifolia)
 Feathery bog-moss (Sphagnum cuspidatum)
 Flat-topped / flexuous bog-mosses (S. recurvum)

Three  rare species are associated with the community:
 Bog-rosemary (Andromeda polifolia)
 Tall bog-sedge (Carex magellanica)
 Golden bog-moss (Sphagnum pulchrum)

Distribution

This community is found in various locations in Wales, southern and northeastern Scotland, and northern England, with an outpost in Norfolk.

Subcommunities

There are two  subcommunities:
 the Rhynchospora alba subcommunity
 the Sphagnum recurvum subcommunity

References

 Rodwell, J. S. (1991) British Plant Communities Volume 2 - Mires and heaths  (hardback),  (paperback)

M02